Primera División de México (Mexican First Division) Verano 1999 is a Mexican football tournament - one of two short tournaments that take up the entire year to determine the champion(s) of Mexican football. It began on Friday, January 15, 1999, and ran until May 9, when the regular season ended. In the final Toluca defeated Atlas and became champions for the fifth time.

Overview

Final standings (groups)

League table

Top goalscorers 
Players sorted first by goals scored, then by last name. Only regular season goals listed.

Source: MedioTiempo

Results

Playoffs

Repechage

Santos won 7–5 on aggregate.

Bracket

Quarterfinals

Toluca won 4–3 on aggregate.

Santos won 3–2 on aggregate.

3–3 on aggregate. Atlas advanced for being the higher seeded team.

Cruz Azul won 4–3 on aggregate.

Semifinals

Toluca won 4–3 on aggregate.

Atlas won 6–0 on aggregate.

Finals

First leg

Second leg

5–5 on aggregate. Toluca won 5–4 on penalty kicks.

Relegation table

Puebla was relegated to Primera División 'A', however, the team remained in the First Division because its owners bought the Unión de Curtidores, a club that had won promotion to the First Division.

References

External links
 Mediotiempo.com (where information was obtained)

1999A
Mexico
1998–99 in Mexican football